Siyah Banuiyeh (also Romanized as Sīyah Banū’īyeh and Sīāhbenū’īyeh; also known as Sīāhbenūyeh and Banū’īyeh)‌. Local name is Sagono (  is a village in Siyah Banuiyeh Rural District, in the Central District of Rabor County, Kerman Province, Iran. At the 2006 census, its population was 2,285, in 499 families.

References 

Populated places in Rabor County